McHugh Island  is a small, rugged, granite island in the Glennie group of islands off the west coast of Wilsons Promontory, Victoria, Australia. It is part of the Wilsons Promontory Islands Important Bird Area, identified as such by BirdLife International because of its importance for breeding seabirds.

External links
 Parks Victoria - Wilsons Promontory Marine National Park

References

Islands of Victoria (Australia)
Wilsons Promontory
Important Bird Areas of Victoria (Australia)